Terenci Moix (real name Ramon Moix i Meseguer; 5 January 1942, in Barcelona – 2 April 2003, in Barcelona) was a Spanish writer, who wrote in Spanish, and in Catalan. He is also the brother of poet/novelist Ana Maria Moix.

Life and work
Self-taught, his first work, La torre de los vicios capitales (La torre dels vicis capitals, in Catalan), was published in 1968. Many of his early works criticised the values of his time, especially the official morality of Francoism. In 1990, he wrote and published a children's book called, Los Grandes Mitos del Cine (English version as "The Greatest Stories of Hollywood Cinema"), which is illustrated by Willi Glasauer, and published by Círculo de Lectores. This children's book includes fun facts, trivia, and information accompanied by photos and Willi Glasauer's illustrations of the classic Hollywood films and stars such as Casablanca, Gone with the Wind, Cleopatra, and Tarzan the Ape Man.

He wrote in several newspapers: Tele-Exprés, Tele-Estel, El Correo Catalán, Destino, Serra d'Or, and El País. He was openly homosexual, and participated in many TV gatherings.

Death
Moix died of emphysema on 2 April 2003 in Barcelona.

Awards
In 1992, he won the Ramon Llull Novel Award for El sexe dels àngels. In 1996, he became the first winner of the Fernando Lara Novel Award for his then-unpublished work El amargo don de la belleza.

An annual literature prize, bearing his name, the Terenci Moix Fundación Arena de Narrativa Gay y Lésbica, has been instituted. It was won most recently by Spanish novelist Rafael Peñas Cruz for his coming-of-age work, Charlie.

Novels
La torre de los vicios capitales
El dia que murio Marilyn
Olas sobre una roca desierta
Món mascle
La caiguda de L'imperi sodomita
La increada conciencia de la raza o melodrama
Sadistic, esperpentic i adhuc metafisic
Nuestro Virgen de los mártires
Amami, Alfredo! o polvo de estrellas
No digas que fue un sueño
Garras de astracan
Mujercisimas
La herida de la esfinge
El arpista ciego
El amargo don de la belleza (2011),

Collections of short stories
La torre de los vicios capitals
Tots els contes (Todos los cuentos)

Essays
Iniciació a una història del cine
Los cómics, arte para el consumo y formas pop
El sadismo de nuestra infancia
Terenci del Nilo
Crónicas italianas
Hollywood stories (2 vols.)
The Greatest Stories of Hollywood Cinema (Illustrated by Willi Glasauer), (Círculo de Lectores)
Tres viajes románticos

References

https://www.tablondeanuncios.com/colecciones/terence_moix_la_noche_no_es_hermosa-3299412.htm

External links
 Terenci Moix at the Association of Catalan Language Writers, AELC. In Catalan, English and Spanish.

1942 births
2003 deaths
Writers from Barcelona
Deaths from emphysema
Spanish novelists
Spanish male novelists
Spanish essayists
Spanish gay writers
Male essayists
20th-century Spanish novelists
20th-century essayists
20th-century Spanish male writers
20th-century Spanish LGBT people